Bergem is a town in the commune of Mondercange, in south-western Luxembourg.  , the town has a population of 1,490 inhabitants.

In close proximity to the town is the confluence of the Alzette and Mess rivers, upon which the Lameschmillen water mill was constructed in twelfth century.

References

Mondercange
Towns in Luxembourg